The Dublin Builder was an illustrated Irish architectural, engineering, mechanics' and sanitary trade magazine published from 1859 to 1866.  It later became known as The Irish Builder.

Historical copies of the Dublin Builder, dating back to 1859, are available to search and view in digitised form at The British Newspaper Archive.

List of Dublin Builder editions available free online
Dublin Builder (1859) - v1
Dublin Builder (1860) - v2
Dublin Builder (1861) - v3
Dublin Builder (1862) - v4
Dublin Builder (1863) - v5
Dublin Builder (1864) - v6
Dublin Builder (1865) - v7
Dublin Builder (1866) - v8

References

Magazines published in Ireland
Defunct magazines published in Ireland
Magazines established in 1859
Magazines disestablished in 1866
Architecture magazines
Engineering magazines
Professional and trade magazines
Mass media in Dublin (city)